The following is an outline of topics related to the British Overseas Territory of the Falkland Islands.

Falkland Islands
 Falkland Islands
 Template:Falkland Islands topics
 Bodie Suspension Bridge
 Falkland Islands at the 2006 Commonwealth Games
 Anthony Cary, 5th Viscount of Falkland
 Geology of the Falkland Islands
 List of fish on stamps of the Falkland Islands
 Port Stanley Airport
 Chris Simpkins
 Transport in the Falkland Islands

Communications in the Falkland Islands
 Communications in the Falkland Islands

Economy of the Falkland Islands
 Economy of the Falkland Islands
 Coins of the Falkland Islands pound
 Falkland Islands Holdings
 Falkland Islands pound

Falkland Islander culture
 Culture of the Falkland Islands
 Camp (Falkland Islands)
 Coat of arms of the Falkland Islands
 Flag of the Falkland Islands

Fauna of the Falklands Islands
 Black-necked swan
 Falkland Island fox

Flags of the Falkland Islands

Geography of the Falkland Islands
 Warrah River
 Chartres River
 Murrell River
 Cape Meredith
 Calm Head
 MacBride Head
 Volunteer Point

Straits, inlets and sounds
 Choiseul Sound
 Engle Passage
 Falkland Sound
 King George Bay
 Byron Sound
 Gypsy Cove
 Keppel Sound

Islands of the Falkland Islands
 Barren Island (Falkland Islands)
 Beauchene Island
 Beaver Island (Falkland Islands)
 Bleaker Island
 Carcass Island
 East Falkland
 Lafonia (peninsula)
 George Island
 Golding Island
 Grand Jason Island
 Jason Islands
 Keppel Island
 Lively Island
 New Island
 Passage Islands
 Pebble Island
 Saunders Island (Falkland Islands)
 Sea Lion Island
 Speedwell Island
 Staats Island
 Steeple Jason Island
 Swan Islands
 Weddell Island
 West Falkland
 West Point Island

Mountains of the Falkland Islands
 Hornsby Mountains
 Mount Maria
 Mount Usborne
 Storm Mountain
 Jack's Mountain
 Wickham Heights

Landforms of the Falkland Islands
 Stone run

Governors of the Falkland Islands
 Governor of the Falkland Islands
 List of Governors of the Falkland Islands
 William Lamond Allardyce
 Roger Goldsworthy
 Nigel Haywood
 Arnold Weinholt Hodson
 Alan Huckle
 Rex Masterman Hunt
 John Middleton (administrator)
 Howard Pearce
 Nigel Phillips
 George Rennie (sculptor and politician)
 Colin Roberts
 William Cleaver Francis Robinson
 Luis Vernet

History of the Falkland Islands
 History of the Falkland Islands
 Timeline of the history of the Falkland Islands
 Re-establishment of British rule on the Falklands (1833)
 Battle of the Falkland Islands
 British Nationality (Falkland Islands) Act 1983
 Operation Journeyman
 Postage stamps and postal history of the Falkland Islands
 Puerto Soledad
 1966 Aerolineas Argentinas DC-4 hijacking

Falklands War
 Falklands War
 1982 invasion of the Falkland Islands
 1982 Liberation Memorial
 Argentine air forces in the Falklands War
 Argentine ground forces in the Falklands War
 Argentine naval forces in the Falklands War
 ARA Almirante Domecq Garcia (D23)
 ARA Almirante Irízar (Q-5)
 ARA Bahía Buen Suceso
 ARA General Belgrano
 ARA Isla de los Estados
 ]
 ARA Santa Fe (S-21)
 British air services in the Falklands War
 British ground forces in the Falklands War
 British naval forces in the Falklands War
 Atlantic Conveyor
 
 
 
 
 
 
 
 
 
 
 Casualties of the Battle of Bluff Cove
 Cultural impact of the Falklands War
 Escuadrón Fénix
 Events leading to the Falklands War
 
 History of South Georgia and the South Sandwich Islands
 Malvinas 2032
 No 6 mine
 Norland
 Oerlikon 35 mm twin cannon
 Operation Algeciras
 Operation Azul
 Operation Black Buck
 Operation Corporate
 Operation Keyhole
 Operation Paraquat
 Operation Purple Warrior
 Operation Rosario
 Operation Sutton
 The Falklands Play
 Weapons of the Falklands War

Battles of the Falklands War
 Battle of Goose Green
 Battle of Mount Harriet
 Battle of Mount Longdon
 Battle of Mount Tumbledown
 Battle of Two Sisters
 Battle of Wireless Ridge

Falklands War media
 Cultural impact of the Falklands War
 Harrier Attack
 Tumbledown
 Yomp (computer game)

Falklands War people
 Jorge Anaya
 Peter Carington, 6th Baron Carrington
 Tam Dalyell
 Leopoldo Galtieri
 Max Hastings
 H. Jones
 Ian John McKay
 Ewen Southby-Tailyour
 Margaret Thatcher
 'Sharkey' Ward
 Simon Weston
 Sandy Woodward

Falklands War military equipment

Falklands War guided missiles
 Aerospatiale SS.12/AS.12

Maps of the Falkland Islands
 Maps of the Falkland Islands

Maps of the history of the Falkland Islands
 Maps of the Falkland Islands

Military of the Falkland Islands
 Military of the Falkland Islands
 Falkland Islands Defence Force
 RAF Mount Pleasant

Politics of the Falkland Islands
 Politics of the Falkland Islands
 Government House (Falkland Islands)
 Governor of the Falkland Islands
 List of Governors of the Falkland Islands
 Executive Council of the Falkland Islands
 Chief Executive of the Falkland Islands
 Director of Finance of the Falkland Islands
 Legislative Assembly of the Falkland Islands
 Speaker of the Legislative Assembly of the Falkland Islands
 Legislative Council of the Falkland Islands
 Supreme Court of the Falkland Islands
 Advisory Committee on the Prerogative of Mercy
 Attorney General of the Falkland Islands

Elections in the Falkland Islands
 Elections in the Falkland Islands
 List of Falkland Islands by-elections
 1949 Falkland Islands general election
 1952 Falkland Islands general election
 1956 Falkland Islands general election
 1960 Falkland Islands general election
 1964 Falkland Islands general election
 1968 Falkland Islands general election
 1971 Falkland Islands general election
 1976 Falkland Islands general election
 1977 Falkland Islands general election
 1981 Falkland Islands general election
 1985 Falkland Islands general election
 1989 Falkland Islands general election
 1993 Falkland Islands general election
 1997 Falkland Islands general election
 2001 Falkland Islands general election
 2005 Falkland Islands general election
 2009 Falkland Islands general election
 2013 Falkland Islands general election
 2017 Falkland Islands general election
 2021 Falkland Islands general election
 Next Falkland Islands general election

Referendums in the Falkland Islands
 1986 Falkland Islands status referendum
 2001 Falkland Islands electoral system referendum
 2011 Falkland Islands electoral system referendum
 2013 Falkland Islands sovereignty referendum
 2020 Falkland Islands electoral system referendum

Religion in the Falkland Islands
 Roman Catholicism in the Falkland Islands
 Anglican Bishop for the Falklands Islands

Settlements in the Falkland Islands
 List of settlements in the Falkland Islands
 List of Argentine names for the Falklands Islands
 Darwin, Falkland Islands
 Goose Green
 Port Egmont
 Port Howard
 Port Louis, Falkland Islands
 Port San Carlos
 Salvador Settlement
 San Carlos, Falkland Islands
 Stanley, Falkland Islands
 Fox Bay
 Ajax Bay
 Port Albemarle
 Walker Creek
 Johnson's Harbour
 Hoste Inlet
 Port Stephens
 Roy Cove
 Hill Cove

Demographics of the Falkland Islands
 Falkland Islanders
 Origins of Falkland Islanders

Categories

See also

List of international rankings
Lists of country-related topics
Outline of geography
Outline of South America

External links

Outlines of countries
Wikipedia outlines